Lepanthes lucifer is a species of orchid endemic to Ecuador.

References

External links 

lucifer
Endemic orchids of Ecuador
Plants described in 1987